Liljendal is a former municipality of Finland.

It is located in the province of Southern Finland and was part of the Eastern Uusimaa region.

The municipality was bilingual, with majority (74.9%) being Swedish and minority (23.8%) Finnish speakers.  The municipality has previously also been known as Liljentaali in Finnish documents.

Liljendal was consolidated to Loviisa, together with Pernå and Ruotsinpyhtää, on January 1, 2010.

History 
Liljendal was originally the name of a seat farm (säteri) in the village of Sävträsk. Its name may have been derived from that of an old Cistercian monastery in Lower Saxony, Lilienthal. At the time, it was a part of the Pernå (Pernaja) parish. The name got its current meaning when the seat farm and nine villages near it became their own chapel community in 1791. Liljendal became a separate parish in 1914.

References

External links

Municipality of Liljendal – Official website 

Former municipalities of Finland
Loviisa
Populated places established in 1575
Populated places disestablished in 2010
2010 disestablishments in Finland